Kaospilot (lit.: Chaos Pilot) is a disruptive education provider and facilitator of learning experiences for individuals, communities and organizations located in Aarhus, Denmark, and surrounded by the creative and vibrant areas of Filmbyen and Sydhavn, at the edge of the city harbor.

Details 
Founded by Uffe Elbæk in 1991, is today funded by the European Union and student fees. 

The education accepts around 35-37 students each year with a minimum age of 21, through a rigorous selections process.Kaospilot programs teach in the fields of leadership, business design, process design and project design. The educational philosophy focuses on personal development, value-based entrepreneurship, creativity and social innovation. The Kaospilot program has been named as one of the world’s 10 best schools for Innovation and Entrepreneurship by FastCompany and by Business Week as one of the top Design schools in the World. Kaospilot has inspired schools in Australia, Norway, Sweden, and The Netherlands.

The education was in Danish until August 2005 as the students were mainly from the Scandinavian countries. Now the official language at Kaospilot is in English, the most commonly spoken secondary language in the region.

In the summer of 2013 the Kaospilot school moved from their old address in Mejlgade to the neighborhood Filmbyen.

Enterprising Leadership Program 
The Kaospilot curriculum is approved by EQUIS, AACSB and AMBA accredited Aarhus BSS, Aarhus University. The Enterprising Leadership Program is a three-year, full-time education divided into semesters in place of classes or subjects. The approach is team based with teams starting, studying, and graduating together.

The Enterprising Leadership Program is not just designed to shape emergent leaders for the future, but
to help them create it. The program is committed to, and in service of, the students cultivating a sense of
personal agency and making a positive contribution to the 21st century.
It is a reality-based education where students work with real people and real challenges in the
world around them. It is a team-based education where the student will learn and work in collaboration
with their peers in a dynamic learning environment where each student contributes with their individual
backgrounds.
The program focuses on providing the student with a holistic approach and behaviour that promotes
enterprising leadership.

Curriculum

Domains 
The curriculum is divided into three domains: Project Design, Process Design and Business Design, with each discipline divided into sub-components. The learning model is based on circular thinking where theory is put into praxis and praxis into theory.
Learning occurs in combination with Knowing, Doing and Being. 
The students’ learning is praxis driven, and learning-by-doing is the foundation for the Kaospilot approach: a nonlinear process of reflection in action and reflection on action. Where Knowing, Doing and Being are set in motion in combination with each other and at the same time.

Enterprising Leadership Practice 
Enterprising Leadership Practice (ELP) is the particular practice that is trained by the students of the program. It is a cross-disciplinary practice that combines, and is based on, the three domains. The practice enables the student to identify and realize good judgement, opportunities and potential within a given context. Over the course of the program, the students develop areas in their personal ELP, which include:
Developing Abilities
The practice is centered around the following six generic abilities: Imagining, Taking Action, Communicating, Sense-making, Collaborating and Learning.
These abilities are practiced alongside specific skills, methods, and theories, related to the three domains.
Cultivating Character
We view leadership as more than a matter of abilities or skills. Cultivating character is a crucial area of development for leaders. We look at the cultivation of character in several ways. This includes the cultivation of values-based leadership as well as certain attitudes, and a considerable focus on virtues.
Key virtues of an enterprising leader include – but are not limited to – Courage, Toughness, Patience, Generosity, Curiosity and Lightness.
Honing a sense of direction
Throughout the program, the students will explore what it means to find their way, and how the students can come to a sense of direction, both on a personal and professional level. This area of the ELP framework draws on knowledge and methods from various fields and disciplines, which support the students in making sense of their journey. These include sociology, philosophy, leadership theories, psychology, and coaching. Inquiries are carried out on various levels and woven into assignments, guidance sessions and evaluations.

Team Leader 
The education relies on the role of the Team Leader, a position unique to the Enterprising Leadership Program. The Team Leader is responsible for designing, developing, and delivering each semester and for the student's development and learning journey. The Team Leader group collaborates and coordinates with each other to create coherence throughout the program. Each team has one or two Team Leader, whose responsibilities depend on the semester or project at hand.
The Team Leader is responsible for the educational design, planning and organizing the execution of the education, leading & hosting the learning processes, the co-creation of the design, execution, and evaluation processes with the students, offer guidance and coaching and building and strengthening the community.

Semester Components

The Outpost Semester 
During the Outpost Semester the whole team is relocated for three months to somewhere in the World. As such, the outpost is an exploration into what happens in the world related to emerging challenges and needs, and the students will learn how to act, work, and create positive impact and value in an unfamiliar context. During the Outpost Semester the students' experience combines lectures, workshops, and numerous parallel projects. 
Some of the locations in which Kaospilot has run its outpost semester have been: Cape Town, San Francisco, Bogotá, Havana, Shanghai, Barcelona and Berlin.

Lecturers of Note 
Kaospilot invites external lecturers to deliver the content of the semesters, through the year hundreds of lecturers have engaged with the students, amongst them: Bliss Browne, Carol Sanford..

References

Further reading

External links

Business schools in Denmark
Higher education in Aarhus
Educational institutions established in 1991
1991 establishments in Denmark